Yvon Becaus (9 April 1936 – 3 December 2016) was a Belgian boxer. He competed in the men's light heavyweight event at the 1960 Summer Olympics. At the 1960 Summer Olympics, he lost to Cassius Clay of the United States.

References

1936 births
2016 deaths
Belgian male boxers
Olympic boxers of Belgium
Boxers at the 1960 Summer Olympics
Sportspeople from Charleroi
Light-heavyweight boxers